Dahlmann is a surname. Notable people with the surname include:

 Annika Dahlmann (born 1964), former Swedish cross country skier
 Friedrich Christoph Dahlmann (1785–1860), German historian and politician
 Hagbarth Dahlmann (1901–1974), Danish field hockey player
 Hermann Dahlmann (1892–1978), influential German aviation administrator during the Third Reich
 Kurt Dahlmann (1918–2017), German pilot, attorney, journalist, newspaper editor and political activist
 Nicolas Dahlmann (1769–1807), French cavalry general of the Napoleonic wars
 Sandra Dahlmann (born 1968), German Olympic swimmer

See also
 Dahlman (disambiguation)